A Prussian Love Story is a 1938 German historical romance film directed by Paul Martin and starring Karl Günther, Hans Nielsen, and Willy Fritsch. The film depicts the love affair between William I and Elisa Radziwill. In the Third Reich the film was banned right after completion because the love affair of Joseph Goebbels and the actress Lída Baarová had become public—it was first shown in 1950.

It was shot at the Babelsberg Studios of UFA in Berlin.

Cast

References

Bibliography

External links

1938 films
1930s historical romance films
German historical romance films
1930s German-language films
Films of Nazi Germany
Films directed by Paul Martin
Films set in the 1820s
Films set in Prussia
Biographical films about German royalty
UFA GmbH films
German black-and-white films
Love stories
Films set in the Kingdom of Prussia
1930s German films
1950s German films
William I, German Emperor